The women's heptathlon event at the 2014 Asian Games was held at the Incheon Asiad Main Stadium, Incheon, South Korea on 28–29 September.

Schedule
All times are Korea Standard Time (UTC+09:00)

Records

Results
Legend
DNF — Did not finish
DNS — Did not start

100 metres hurdles
 Wind – Heat 1: −0.3 m/s
 Wind – Heat 2: −0.5 m/s

High jump

Shot put

200 metres 
 Wind – Heat 1: +0.4 m/s
 Wind – Heat 2: +0.6 m/s

Long jump

Javelin throw

800 metres

Summary

References

Heptathlon
2014 women